Senator Blevins may refer to:

Harry Blevins (1935–2018), Virginia State Senate
Patricia Blevins (born 1954), Delaware State Senate